Dynamo Balashikha was an ice hockey team in Balashikha, Russia. They played in the VHL, the second level of Russian ice hockey. The club was founded in 2010 as an affiliate of Dynamo Moscow of the Kontinental Hockey League and replaced HC MVD as a main ice hockey team of Balashikha.

Notable players
 Alexei Sopin (2011–15)
 Aleksandr Shibaev (2012–15)
 Klim Kostin (2016–17)

References

External links
Official Website

Ice hockey teams in Russia
Ice hockey in Moscow Oblast
Ice hockey clubs established in 2010
2010 establishments in Russia
Ice hockey clubs disestablished in 2017